Las Brujas Airport is an airport serving Salamanca, a town in the Coquimbo Region of Chile.

There is mountainous terrain in all quadrants.

See also

Transport in Chile
List of airports in Chile

References

External links
OpenStreetMap - Las Brujas
OurAirports - Las Brujas
FallingRain - Las Brujas Airport

Airports in Coquimbo Region